NFL Street 3 is the third installment of the NFL Street series, released in November 2006 for the PlayStation 2 and PlayStation Portable consoles. This installment features more game modes and unlockable features than previous versions. Chad Johnson of the Cincinnati Bengals appears on the cover and was the official spokesperson of the game.

Reception

The game received "average" reviews, according to video game review aggregator Metacritic.

Awards
 Winner for Best Alternative Sports Game of 2006 for PlayStation 2 from IGN.

References

External links
 

2006 video games
EA Sports games
EA Sports Big games
National Football League video games
PlayStation 2 games
PlayStation Portable games
Video games developed in the United States
Multiplayer and single-player video games